Sian (also Romanized as Sīān, Seyān, and Sīyān; also known as Shiān, Siūni, and Sīyūnī) is a village in Rudasht Rural District, Jolgeh District, Isfahan County, Isfahan Province, Iran. At the 2006 census, its population was 581, in 151 families.

References 

Populated places in Isfahan County